The 1993 Ole Miss Rebels football team represented the University of Mississippi during the 1993 NCAA Division I-A football season. The Rebels were led by 11th-year head coach Billy Brewer and played their home games at Vaught–Hemingway Stadium in Oxford, Mississippi, and alternate-site home games at Mississippi Veterans Memorial Stadium in Jackson, Mississippi. They competed as members of the Southeastern Conference, finishing tied for fourth in the Western Division with a record of 5–6 (3–5 SEC). Alabama would later forfeit all of their 1993 wins, bringing Ole Miss's official record to 6–5 (4–4 SEC).

Schedule

Sources:

References

Ole Miss
Ole Miss Rebels football seasons
Ole Miss Rebels football